China National Pharmaceutical Group, known as Sinopharm and sometimes Sinopharm Group, is a Chinese state-owned enterprise, ultimate parent company of all Sinopharm companies

Sinopharm  may also refer to:

 Sinopharm BIBP COVID-19 vaccine
 Sinopharm WIBP COVID-19 vaccine
 Sinopharm Industrial Investment, an intermediate holding company and parent company of Sinopharm Group Co., Ltd.
 Sinopharm Group Co., Ltd., a Chinese publicly traded company on the Stock Exchange of Hong Kong

See also
 China National Medicines Corporation Ltd., known as Sinopharm CNMC, a Chinese publicly traded company on the Shanghai Stock Exchange
 China National Accord Medicines Corp., Ltd. known as Sinopharm Accord, a Chinese publicly traded company on the Shenzhen Stock Exchange